Reichshof may refer to:

 Reichshof, a Northrhine-Westfalian municipality in the Oberbergischer Kreis in Germany
 The German name from 1941 to 1945 for Rzeszów, the biggest city in southeastern Poland